Valenzano may refer to:

Valenzano, Italy, a town in Italy
Valenzano Winery, a winery in New Jersey
Gino Valenzano, racing driver